Grand Ayatollah Sayyid Ali Hassani Baghdadi  (Arabic:  السيد علي الحسني البغدادي) (born 1955) is an Iraqi Twelver Shi'a Marja.

He has studied in seminaries of Najaf, Iraq under Grand Ayatollah Abul-Qassim Khoei and Mohammad Baqir al-Sadr.

See also
List of Maraji

Notes

External links
List of publications

Iraqi grand ayatollahs
Iraqi Islamists
Shia Islamists
1954 births
Living people